Henry Charles 'Hal' Bevan-Petman (1894–1980) was a British painter, who made a career in British India and Pakistan. He stayed through during the Partition of India and chose to reside in Pakistan, till his demise on 9 May 1980 in Rawalpindi.  He painted significant civil and military personalities, landscapes and still life. His works included many Pakistan Army officers, two of whom became Pakistan's Heads of State: Field Marshal Ayub Khan and General Yahya Khan. He is buried in the Christian Graveyard in Rawalpindi, Pakistan.

Early life
Born in Barton Regis Rural District, Gloucestershire, England on 28 October 1894, to Bertram Amor Bevan-Petman (1870–1931) and Maria Minnie Bevan Petman (1869–1942), his family was of Anglo-Indian ancestry, and included prominent lawyers and judges who served at various eminent positions during the British Raj. He was educated at Clifton College, Bristol "Clifton College Register" Muirhead, J.A.O. p288: Bristol; J.W Arrowsmith for Old Cliftonian Society; April 1948 from 1908 to 1910 and resided through this period at North Town Boys House; and played cricket for the Clifton College XI at Lord's against Tonbridge in 1914. 
 
Bevan-Petman subsequently applied to and was accepted by Slade School of Fine Art in 1914, and received a two-year scholarship amounting to £35. This scholarship was then renewed in 1916. During this scholastic period he received the First Prize for Figure Painting and Figure Drawing. Furthermore, he was awarded certificates in Perspective, History of Art, Figure Drawing, and satisfied the requirements for a Diploma in Fine Art in History of Art (Painting in Spain and the Netherlands). He graduated from Slade School of Art in 1917 after being awarded a certificate in 'Painting from Life'.

Career beginnings
As a young artist in 1920s London, he painted models who came to be known as 'The Petman Girls', serialised in The Illustrated London News, The Sketch and Bystander. The drawings were considered risque in a prudish post-Edwardian era, and could be considered as precursors to the modern 'Page 3 Girls' of The Sun Newspaper of today.

These drawings clearly reflect his trademark long necks in all his models, and was to become his signature in later works.

Prints of these drawings are classified as vintage erotica, and can be purchased off the web. It is unclear where the original artworks reside, but, by any standard they remain highly collectible, signifying a rare genre of its time.

Copies of these pastel drawings can be searched and viewed at the Mary Evans Picture Library

Personal life
Records show that Hal Bevan-Petman married three times to:
 Ms. Frances Slough (an artists model), whom he married on 25 April 1917 to 1923 producing one offspring named Minnie Frances Duncan.
 Ms. Gabrielle Hunter from 1927 to 1935 No offspring is reported.
 Ms. Beryl Dyer (a former dance hall hostess at Standards & Stifles), Lahore. They married in 1940 at Naulakha Church, Lahore. No offspring is reported. She lived many years, later after his death, in Abbottabad, Pakistan On her death she was also buried next to him in Rawalpindi.

Pre-partition British India
Hal Bevan-Petman painted many landscapes during this era and on one occasion was commissioned by the India Tourism Office for a 'See India' poster. The mountain ranges of Kashmir appear frequently in his landscapes and are considered rare.
During this time, he also taught a young Amrita Sher-Gil (1913–1941), who went on to become a talented Indian painter. He also had clients from Indian Royalty for whom he did portraits and the occasional risque renditions. This included the Nawab of Bahawalpur, who corresponded with Hal on a regular basis. Such commissions have remained very private, elusive and very rarely displayed.

Post-Partition Pakistan 
During his time in Pakistan he painted practically every notable personality and/or their spouses, ranging from Mohammad Ali Jinnah, the founder of Pakistan, various subsequent presidents and Military Commanders. 
He was commissioned to paint military battle scenes which adorn the walls of various Pakistani Military Academic Institutions.
He also painted several war heroes who were decorated posthumously with the Nishan-e-Haider, Pakistan's highest military award.  One of the most celebrated amongst them is Major Raja Aziz Bhatti.

Death
He died on 9 May 1980 and is buried in the Rawalpindi Christian Cemetery flanked by the graves of his wife Beryl and sister-in-law, Eve Strauss née Dyer respectively.

Art
He is known to have built a considerable reputation in the art scene and was commissioned by the Pakistan Army to paint many Generals, Commanders and Battle Scenes. Most of the portraits are held in Private Collections, and many adorn various Pakistan Army's Educational Institutions, Messes and Regimental Headquarters.
The Ladies portraits of various socialites and influential personalities are considered romanticised renditions with almost hazily surreal backgrounds.
Queen Elizabeth II was presented four paintings by the Government of Pakistan in 1961. These paintings are on display at Sandringham House and are part of the Royal Collection.

According to an article published in The News by Chris Cork, who in his article remarked, "He was a quick painter, three or four sittings and the work was done. Looking at his pictures today they are almost ephemeral. Not for him the heavy brushstroke but instead a hint of a smile, a slightly raised and querulent eyebrow and those Petman eyes, all so different but identifiably Petman eyes no matter who they belonged to in the first place."

Documentary
Given the limited credit he received after his demise within the art circles in Pakistan, several private collectors and enthusiasts are now gathering momentum to celebrate the art of Hal Bevan-Petman. A privately funded documentary project was incepted to produce a snapshot of the artist, his work, and features some of his models giving their views on the experience they had with him whilst being painted. 
A preview of the production, called 'Discovering Petman', can by viewed on Vimeo.
The documentary is directed by Taqi Shaheen, researched entirely by Romano Karim Yusuf.
The documentary in rough cut was premiered at Kuch Khaas on 4 September 2012, receiving positive reviews.
Kuch Khaas, is a non-profit organisation promoting local art, artists and literary events in Islamabad. This rough cut also featured in 'Migration Stories', a British Council Pakistan roadshow in 2013.

Book
A coffee table book based on the collection of his works, a comprehensive research and interviews of some Hal's models/clients is being compiled by Romano Karim Yusuf and was scheduled to be published in 2016.

References

External links 
 http://www.halbevanpetman.com/index.html
 https://web.archive.org/web/20110918232104/http://www.artspak.com/hal_bevan.htm
 http://www.fridakahlofans.com/amritafans.com/bio-page1.html
 http://www.taqishaheen.com/films.php
 http://dedachi.taqishaheen.com/
 https://www.facebook.com/HalBevanPetman
 http://tribune.com.pk/story/432170/documentary-screening-brushes-with-brilliance-an-artist-revealed/
 http://www.kuchkhaas.org/the-forgotten-society-painter-hal-bevan-petman/
 http://www.artspak.com/hal_bevan.php
 http://www.danka.pk/?var_action=event_details&event_id=17977
 https://archive.today/20130705183830/http://www.vone.pk/events/1716/title/Hal-Bevan-Petman-The-Forgotten-Society-Painter.html
 http://dhatoday.com/tag/hal-bevan-petman/
 http://www.thenews.com.pk/Todays-News-6-130487-Documentary-on-portr..
 http://dawn.com/2013/05/12/art-fiend-no-clash-of-civilisations-here/
 http://www.maryevans.com/search.php
 http://www.thenews.com.pk/Todays-News-9-131114-Another-country

People educated at Clifton College
1894 births
1980 deaths
Alumni of the Slade School of Fine Art
20th-century English painters
English male painters
Pakistani painters
English emigrants to Pakistan
British people in colonial India
20th-century English male artists